Ikaw ang Pag-ibig (English: You Are the Love) is a 2011 religious family-drama film written and directed by Marilou Diaz-Abaya and released by Star Cinema with the Archdiocese of Caceres and Marilou Diaz-Abaya Film Institute and Arts Center. It commemorates the tercentenary of the devotion to Our Lady of Peñafrancia, the patroness of the Bicol Region in the Philippines. It is the last film directed by Diaz-Abaya before she died in 2012. The film was released on September 14, 2011.

Plot
Vangie Cruz (Ina Feleo) is a rebellious woman whose family life and career as a video editor are disrupted when her only brother, a newly ordained priest, Fr. Johnny (Marvin Agustin), is diagnosed of Acute Myeloid Leukemia. As a sibling, Vangie is called upon to be a donor for Fr. Johnny's bone marrow transplant. At first, Vangie is very reluctant. She has a clinical phobia for medical procedures, the reasons for which are rooted in an attempted, but botched, abortion which she suffered through many years earlier and has since been troubled about. Her life is saved by Dr. Joey Lucas (Jomari Yllana) with whom she has a love child, and whom she eventually marries. Vangie's dysfunctional family gravitates around Fr. Johnny, and in their struggle to cope with his illness, find themselves drawn to Ina, begging for her intercession. Their prayers are answered, not so much by way of a miraculous cure for Fr. Johnny, but by the grace of conversion, of love, of forgiveness, reconciliation, and hope.

Cast
Ina Feleo as Evangeline "Vangie" Cruz
Jomari Yllana as Dr. Joey Lucas 
Marvin Agustin as Fr. Johnny 
Jaime Fabregas
Nonie Buencamino
Shamaine Buencamino
Yogo Singh
Eddie Garcia

Production
Preparations for the film began in July 2010. The film was helmed by the director of Muro-Ami and Sa Pusod ng Dagat, Marilou Diaz-Abaya. Initially, the film's tentative titles were Peñafrancia and Ina, but these later changed to Ikaw ang Pag-Ibig. Filming started middle of 2010 in Naga City during the 300th anniversary of Our Lady of Peñafrancia. Unitel Productions was supposed to produce this film but when it backed out, the Archdiocese of Caceres in Naga City, Camarines Sur decided to fund the project.

Reception
The film was Graded "A" by the Cinema Evaluation Board, and Rated PG-13 by the Movie and Television Ratings and Classification Board. It has also been endorsed by the Catholic Bishops Conference of the Philippines, the Association of Catholic Universities and the Manila Archdiocese and Parochial Schools, Association, Inc.

References

External links

2011 films
Philippine drama films
Filipino-language films
Films shot in Camarines Sur
Star Cinema films
2011 drama films
Films directed by Marilou Diaz-Abaya